KTMN (97.9 FM) is a radio station licensed to serve the community of Cloudcroft, New Mexico. The station is owned by Cloudcroft Broadcasting Corporation. It airs a classic rock format.

The station was assigned the KTMN call letters by the Federal Communications Commission on September 17, 2014.

References

External links
 Official Website
 

TMN
Radio stations established in 2016
2016 establishments in New Mexico
Classic rock radio stations in the United States
Otero County, New Mexico